Sri Muthu Vinagar Kovil is a Hindu temple located in Ariyalai, Sri Lanka. It is one of the oldest temples in that area. Temple worships happen 3 times a day. Management Committee consists of eleven members and is elected for 3 years. Temple is registered under the Hindu Cultural Ministry with the registration number HA/5/JA/1438 on 2 April 2012

References 

Hindu temples in Jaffna District
Pillaiyar temples in Sri Lanka